The Apostolic Vicariate of Mongo is a Latin Church pre-diocesan missionary jurisdiction or apostolic vicariate in Sahel-country Chad.

It is immediately exempt to the Holy See, specifically the missionary Congregation for the Evangelization of Peoples, and is not part of any ecclesiastical province.

Its cathedral is the Cathédrale Saint-Ignace, dedicated to Ignatius of Loyola (founder and patron saint of the Society of Jesus), in the episcopal see of Mogo, in Guéra.

History 
The jurisdiction was established on 1 December 2001 as the Apostolic Prefecture of Mongo from territory split off from the metropolitan Archdiocese of N'Djaména and from the Diocese of Sarh.

It was promoted on 3 June 2009 as the Apostolic Vicariate of Mongo, and is administered by to a titular bishop who acts as ordinary.

Ordinaries 
Apostolic Prefect of Mongo 
 Henry Coudray, S.J. (1 December 2001  – 3 June 2009 see below)

Apostolic Vicars of Mongo
 Henry Coudray, S.J. (see above 3 June 2009 – 14 December 2020), Titular Bishop of Silli (3 June 2009 – ... )
Philippe Abbo Chen, N.D.V. (14 December 2020 - ...)

See also 
 Catholic Church in Chad

References

External links 
 GCatholic with incumbent bio links

2001 establishments in Chad
Christian organizations established in 2001
Apostolic vicariates
Former Roman Catholic dioceses in Africa